A list of Kannada language films produced in the Kannada film industry in India in 2011.
 Films are generally released every Friday
 In addition films can be released on specific festival days.

Released films

January–June

July – December

Notable Deaths

References

External links
Kannada films of 2011 at the Internet Movie Database
Kannada movies released in 2011 at Oneindia.in

2011
Lists of 2011 films by country or language
2011 in Indian cinema